The UK Singles Chart is one of many music charts compiled by the Official Charts Company that calculates the best-selling singles of the week in the United Kingdom. Before 2004, the chart was only based on the sales of physical singles. This list shows singles that peaked in the Top 10 of the UK Singles Chart during 1979, as well as singles which peaked in 1978 and 1980 but were in the top 10 in 1979. The entry date is when the single appeared in the top 10 for the first time (week ending, as published by the Official Charts Company, which is six days after the chart is announced).

One-hundred and forty-one singles were in the top ten in 1979. Nine singles from 1978 remained in the top 10 for several weeks at the beginning of the year, while "Day Trip to Bangor (Didn't We Have a Lovely Time)" by Fiddler's Dram, "Wonderful Christmastime" by Paul McCartney and "Brass in Pocket" by The Pretenders were all released in 1979 but did not reach their peak until 1980. "Song for Guy" by Elton John, "Lay Your Love on Me" by Racey and "Y.M.C.A." by The Village People were the singles from 1978 to reach their peak in 1979. Thirty-two artists scored multiple entries in the top 10 in 1979. Dire Straits, The Jam, Madness, The Police and The Specials were among the many artists who achieved their first UK charting top 10 single in 1979.

The 1978 Christmas number-one, "Mary's Boy Child – Oh My Lord" by Boney M., remained at number-one for the first two weeks of 1979. The first new number-one single of the year was "YMCA" by The Village People. Overall, eighteen different singles peaked at number-one in 1979, with Blondie, Gary Numan and The Police (2) having the joint most singles hit that position.

Background

Multiple entries
One-hundred and forty-one singles charted in the top 10 in 1979, with one-hundred and thirty-one singles reaching their peak this year.

Thirty-two artists scored multiple entries in the top 10 in 1979. ABBA secured the record for most top 10 hits in 1979 with five hit singles.

Gary Numan was one of a number of artists with two top-ten entries, including the number-one single "Cars". Barbra Streisand, Edwin Starr, Ian Dury and the Blockheads, Paul McCartney and The Specials were among the other artists who had multiple top 10 entries in 1979.

Chart debuts
Fifty-two artists achieved their first top 10 single in 1979, either as a lead or featured artist. Of these, eight went on to record another hit single that year: Amii Stewart, B. A. Robertson, Gary Numan, Gibson Brothers, Sister Sledge, The Specials, Squeeze and Supertramp. Earth, Wind and Fire and The Police both had two other entries in their breakthrough year.

The following table (collapsed on desktop site) does not include acts who had previously charted as part of a group and secured their first top 10 solo single.

Songs from films
Original songs from various films entered the top 10 throughout the year. These included "Bright Eyes" (from Watership Down) and "Theme From "The Deer Hunter" (Cavatina)" (The Deer Hunter).

Best-selling singles
Art Garfunkel had the best-selling single of the year with "Bright Eyes". The single spent nine weeks in the top 10 (including six weeks at number one) and was certified platinum by the BPI. "Heart of Glass" by Blondie came in second place. Cliff Richard's "We Don't Talk Anymore", "I Don't Like Mondays" from The Boomtown Rats and "When You're in Love with a Beautiful Woman" by Dr. Hook made up the top five. Singles by Gloria Gaynor, Tubeway Army, Roxy Music, Blondie ("Sunday Girl") and Lena Martell were also in the top ten best-selling singles of the year.

Top-ten singles
Key

Entries by artist

The following table shows artists who achieved two or more top 10 entries in 1979, including singles that reached their peak in 1978 or 1980. The figures include both main artists and featured artists, while appearances on ensemble charity records are also counted for each artist. The total number of weeks an artist spent in the top ten in 1979 is also shown.

Notes

 "Day Trip to Bangor (Didn't We Have a Lovely Time)" reached its peak of number-three on 5 January 1980 (week ending).
 "Car 67" re-entered the top 10 at number 7 on 3 February 1979 (week ending) for 3 weeks.
 "Hallelujah" was Israel's winning entry at the Eurovision Song Contest in 1979.
 "Parisienne Walkways" re-entered the top 10 at number 10 on 2 June 1979 (week ending).
 "H.A.P.P.Y. Radio" re-entered the top 10 at number 9 on 30 June 1979 (week ending).
 Only Paul McCartney was credited for "Wonderful Christmastime" but the rest of his group, Wings, were featured in the promotional music video.
 Figure includes single that peaked in 1978.
 Figure includes a top 10 hit with the group The Jacksons.
 Figure includes a top 10 hit with the group Thin Lizzy.
 Figure includes a top 10 hit with the group Wings.
 Figure includes single that peaked in 1980.
 Figure includes single that first charted in 1978 but peaked in 1979.

See also
1979 in British music
List of number-one singles from the 1970s (UK)

References
General

Specific

External links
1979 singles chart archive at the Official Charts Company (click on relevant week)

United Kingdom
Top 10 singles
1979